Joao Fernando Johanning Mora (born 15 May 1990) is a Bissau-Guinean footballer who most recently played as a midfielder, winger or forward for Chattanooga FC.

Career
At the age of 17, Johanning arrived in Costa Rica from Guinea-Bissau through his adoptive mother, missionary Isabel Johanning.

As a youth player, he joined the youth academy of Saprissa, Costa Rica's most successful club.

In 2019, he signed for American fourth division side Chattanooga FC after playing for Atlanta Silverbacks in the American fourth division.

References

External links
 
 Joao Johanning at playmakerstats.com

1990 births
Living people
Costa Rican people of Bissau-Guinean descent
Bissau-Guinean emigrants to Costa Rica
Bissau-Guinean footballers
Costa Rican footballers
Association football forwards
Liga FPD players
National Premier Soccer League players
Atlanta Silverbacks players
Chattanooga FC players
Bissau-Guinean expatriate footballers
Costa Rican expatriate footballers
Bissau-Guinean expatriate sportspeople in the United States
Costa Rican expatriate sportspeople in the United States
Expatriate soccer players in the United States